Stanley Clark Cole (October 12, 1945 – July 26, 2018) was a water polo player from the United States, who competed in three consecutive Summer Olympics for his native country, starting in 1964. He won the bronze medal with the Men's National Team at the 1972 Summer Olympics in Munich, West Germany. In 1984, he was inducted into the USA Water Polo Hall of Fame.

See also
 List of Olympic medalists in water polo (men)

References

External links
 
 Stanley Cole's obituary

1945 births
2018 deaths
American male water polo players
Water polo players at the 1964 Summer Olympics
Water polo players at the 1968 Summer Olympics
Water polo players at the 1972 Summer Olympics
Olympic bronze medalists for the United States in water polo
Place of birth missing
Medalists at the 1972 Summer Olympics
Deaths from cholangiocarcinoma